The Lido Golf Club was a golf course in Long Beach, Nassau County, Long Island, New York.

Construction
The Lido was designed by Charles B. Macdonald, with contributions from other designers, and constructed in 1915. Construction required that "thousands of pounds of sand" be pumped out of the bay to reclaim what had been a marsh. The advantage was that "the exact contours required by the course architects" could be achieved. Turf bricks were cut from nearby property to lay the greens. The course was open by the summer of 1917.
More than 2,000,0000 cubic yards were pumped in from Long Beach channel by five hydraulic dredges. Hills forty feet high and undulations corresponding were thus constructed. Forty thousand cubic yards of meadow muck were lifted and placed as a soil for all the fairways, greens and tees. Among the incidentals more than 2,500 tons of lime, 6,000 tons of fertilizers, and 35,000 tons of top soil. The entire rough was planted by hand with beach grass, each in squares eighteen inches apart. Nearly a million plants were required. They hold the sand in place and at the same time afford an excellent hazard. An irrigation system provides for every foot of the expanse.

Description
In 1921, Walter Hagen listed the Lido as one of golf's "Big Three" courses, along with the National Links, and Pine Valley. An assessment after completion described the course as "the greatest test in the world, with the possible exception of Pine Valley." 
On two holes at high tide the surf scatters spray over the greens, while the ocean seems scarcely more than a drive, a brassey and approach from any of the tees. The course proper covers 115 acres, over seven of which flows the lagoon, an artificial lake dredged twelve feet deep with made-land in the centre constituting the island hole.… The home hole was built after the design of the best of more than one hundred plans submitted in a prize contest conducted in England for the best two-shot stretch.

Course

The Lido provided a championship, a regular, and a short course.

History
Unfortunately the course opening coincided with the United States' entry into World War I, and for the summer of 1918 management was forced to lower the annual dues from $200 to $60, and make the course easier to attract more amateur players.

In 1942, during World War II, the United States Navy acquired the property and destroyed the course to construct a navy base. After the war, in 1953, a new course was built nearby, called the Lido, designed by Robert Trent Jones. In 2021, Michael and Chris Kieser, operators of the Sand Valley golf club in Wisconsin undertook to construct a replica of the Lido in the Wisconsin sand barrens. This course is expected to be completed in 2023.

References

Golf clubs and courses in New York (state)
Golf clubs and courses designed by Charles B. Macdonald
Defunct golf clubs and courses
1921 establishments in New York (state)
1942 disestablishments in New York (state)